"The Gentleman From Seventh Avenue" was an American television play broadcast on January 30, 1958, as part of the second season of the CBS television series Playhouse 90. Elick Moll wrote the teleplay, Allen Reisner directed, Martin Manulis was the producer, and Albert Heschong was the art director. Walter Slezak, Patricia Neal, and Sylvia Sidney starred.

Plot
A dress manufacturer, Mr. Golden, discovers his attractive designer in tears and takes her to dinner where he learns that she has fallen for the company's playboy salesman. Mr. Golden's paternal actions are misinterpreted by his wife and others.

Cast
The following performers received screen credit for their performances:

 Walter Slezak - Mr. Golden
 Patricia Neal - Rena Menken
 Sylvia Sidney - Mrs. Golden
 Robert Alda - Morris Kogen
 Lawrence Dobkin - Elbaum
 Joyce Jameson - Miss Cooper
 Howard Dayton - Sidney
 Peggy Maley - Shelley
 Judy Nugent - Jenny
 Don Washbrook - Marvin
 Amanda Randolph - Gladys
 Leo Fuchs - Bianco
 Carol Morris (Miss Universe) - Model
 Ingrid Goude (Miss Sweden) - Model

References

1958 television plays
1958 American television episodes
Playhouse 90 (season 2) episodes